Busan Foreign Language High School (Korean: 부산외국어고등학교, Hanja: 釜山外國語高等學校) is a private foreign language high school that is located in Yeonsan-dong, Yeonsan-gu, Busan, South Korea.

Majors 

 English-Japanese major (class 1~3)
 English-French major (class 4~5)
 English-Deutsche major (class 6~7)
 English-Chinese major (class 8~10)

Scholarship 
Busan Foreign Language High School has three scholarship; one for freshmen, and two for enrolled students. The freshmen scholarship is recognized to ten students every year they matriculate. Two students each from French and Deutsche major, and three students each from Japanese and Chinese major; total of ten students with the highest placement test score receives the scholarship. Enrolled scholarship are divided into internal and external one. Internal test score scholarship is also recognized to ten students but many factors other than test score are considered. The external scholarship is a whole recommendation system. First two scholarship is 1,000,000 won. External scholarship differs  by its kind.

History 

January 9, 1985: Permission for the establishment of Busan Foreign Language High School, doctor of law Yijoe Han inaugurated as the first chairman of the board.
March 1, 1985: Gyucheol Lee inaugurated as the first principal.
March 7, 1985: Opening and matriculation ceremony.
March 2, 1986: Construction of the school building complete.
February 11, 1988: The first graduation ceremony.
February 28, 1989: Expansion of the school building complete.
September 17, 1991: Permission as special-purpose high school for Busan Foreign Language High School.
April 22, 2015: Doctor of commerce and trade Seungwan Han inaugurated as the third chairman of the board.
March 1, 2017: Jongsun Lee inaugurated as the 10th principal.
February 12, 2019: The 32nd graduation ceremony (229 students graduated, accumulated number 13,600)
March 4, 2019: The 35th matriculation ceremony (237 students matriculated)

Notable alumni
Park Gyu-young, actress
Park Joon-hyung, comedian

References

External links 
 

Busan
High schools in South Korea
Educational institutions established in 1985
1985 establishments in South Korea